Frederick Thomas Poole MBE (26 September 1935 – 7 June 2017) was the first blind person in Britain to train and practice as a barrister.

References 

1935 births
2017 deaths
Deaths from cancer
English barristers
People from Sutton Coldfield
Alumni of the University of Cambridge
English blind people
Members of the Order of the British Empire
British disability rights activists
20th-century English lawyers